The Council of Nordic Trade Unions (NFS) is a regional trade union federation. It represents 9 million members from 16 national trade unions in the Nordic countries of Europe. It was founded in 1972, and has close ties with the Baltic Sea Trade Union Network (BASTUN). The main task of NFS is to co-ordinate trade union activities in the Nordic countries, particularly with regard to employment, economic policy and different social issues. General Secretary, since 2014, is Magnus Gissler.

Affiliates

General Secretaries 
1981: John Svenningsen
1989: Sune Ahlen
c.2000: Tom Saxén
2011: Loa Brynjulfsdottir
2013: Christina Colclough
2014: Magnus Gissler

References

External links 

 
1972 establishments in Europe
Trade unions established in 1972